The Sunwolves – previously known as the HITO-Communications Sunwolves for sponsorship reasons – were a professional rugby union team and Japan's representative team in SANZAAR's international Super Rugby competition. The team was based in Tokyo, Japan, but also played some home matches in Singapore. They made their debut in Super Rugby in 2016. In March 2019, it was announced that 2020 would be the final season for the Sunwolves, after failing to negotiate a contract due to financial considerations.

With the suspension of the 2020 season due to the COVID-19 pandemic, and the Sunwolves being declined entry into the replacement Super Rugby AU competition in Australia due to various factors, the team officially dissolved on 1 June 2020.

History

Inclusion in Super Rugby
Since its launch in 1996, the SANZAR-organised Super Rugby competition (previously known as Super 12 and Super 14) was limited to teams from Australia, New Zealand and South Africa. In 2011, it was announced that SANZAR would expand its international Tri Nations competition to include Argentina, which resulted in that competition being rebranded as The Rugby Championship. This led to rumours that Argentina would also seek to have teams included in the Super Rugby competition and SANZAR confirmed that they would explore expansion to other regions in future. However, since SANZAR sold the existing Super Rugby package to its broadcasters for the period 2011–15, it meant that no changes to the format would be permitted until the 2016 season.

In 2013, SANZAR CEO Greg Peters announced that Super Rugby would be expanded from the 2016 season onwards, adding that South African franchise the  would be one of the expansion teams. In early 2014, SANZAR confirmed that Super Rugby would be increased from 15 to 18 teams starting from the 2016 season, with Argentine side  getting one of the additional spots. It was confirmed that both Argentina and the 18th team would participate in the South African Conference.

Asia emerged as the preferred destination for the final licence and Japan and Singapore emerged as the main contenders to get the franchise. With a number of factors counting in Japan's favour – such as their domestic professional league (the Top League) increasingly being able to attract big-name foreign players, the country being awarded the hosting of the 2019 Rugby World Cup and the Japanese national team breaking into the top ten of the World Rugby rankings for the first time in their history in 2014 – they were subsequently granted the licence for the 18th franchise in October 2014 – with an agreement reached that Singapore would host three of their home matches each season at the Singapore Sports Hub. The new expanded format and three new teams were formally approved by the SANZAR Executive Committee in November 2014.

In April 2015, the JRFU established a corporation called Japan Super Rugby Association that would manage the operations of the team. A number of key appointments were also made; Yoshitaka Tashiro was appointed as chairman, Yuichi Ueno as the CEO and on the playing side, the Japan national team's head coach Eddie Jones was appointed as the director of rugby for the team. In May 2015, a website was launched to ask fans for team name suggestions.

However, several doubts were raised against Japan's ability to set up the team on time. In August 2015, Eddie Jones announced that he would leave his role as director of rugby amid speculation linking him to the vacant  head coach position. Subsequent media reports stated that governing body SANZAR were exploring alternative plans for the 2016 Super Rugby competition which excluded the Japanese team, but the JRFU commented shortly after, confirming that they have met SANZAR's requirements by contracting players and other personnel by their end-of-August deadline. The validity of the player list submitted was questioned, with many players included not "generally associated with the national team". There were also suggestions that Top League teams requested that their players' appearances be limited in Super Rugby and that Top League matches would be prioritised.

However, they were included in the Super Rugby fixture list that came out on 28 September 2015 and on 5 October 2015, it was announced that the team would be known as the Sunwolves.

Name

In May 2015, a website was launched to ask fans for team name suggestions. This was initially scheduled to be revealed at the end of July 2015, before being postponed to August. On 5 October 2015, it was announced that the team would be known as the Sunwolves. This name was chosen from 3,320 entries and is a combination of the "Land of the Rising Sun" and the wolf, which was chosen to represent bravery, strength and an ethos of teamwork. The team's logo was also launched on the same date.

On 15 January 2016, the Sunwolves announced that they would be known as the HITO-Communications Sunwolves following a sponsorship agreement.

Future
In March 2019, the Japanese Rugby Football Union announced the 2020 season would be the Sunwolves' last in Super Rugby after failing to negotiate a contract to play after that year for financial reasons.

Season summaries
The following table summarises the Sunwolves' results in Super Rugby:

Legend: PF = Points for, PA = Points against, Pos = Log position.

Kit history
The Sunwolves have played in the following kits since their inception:

Stadium
Sunwolves home games are split between Chichibunomiya Rugby Stadium in Tokyo, Japan and Singapore National Stadium, Singapore.

Staff

Final squad
The squad for the 2020 Super Rugby season:

</onlyinclude>

Coaching staff

The following coaching team was appointed for the 2020 Super Rugby season:

List of head coaches

See also

 Rugby union in Japan
 Ganbatte Trophy

References

External links

 
 JRFU website

 
Sports teams in Tokyo
Rugby union in Singapore
Super Rugby teams
2015 establishments in Japan
Rugby clubs established in 2015
Rugby union clubs disestablished in 2020
2020 disestablishments in Japan